James A. Berthelot was a member of the territorial senate in Florida. He was elected president of the senate unanimously.

The Florida Archives have a campaign poster for him and two candidates for the Florida House of Representatives. He and the speaker of the Florida House signed onto a request submitted to the U.S. Congress for recompense to Floridians for property losses in the Seminole Wars.

See also
List of presidents of the Florida Senate

References

Year of birth missing
19th-century American politicians
Members of the Florida Territorial Legislature
Members of the Florida House of Representatives
Presidents of the Florida Senate
Year of birth unknown
Year of death unknown
Date of death unknown
Date of birth unknown
Place of birth unknown
Place of death unknown